These are the official results of the Men's marathon event at the 1982 European Championships in Athens, Greece, held on 12 September 1982.

Medalists

Abbreviations
All times shown are in hours:minutes:seconds

Final ranking

Participation
According to an unofficial count, 35 athletes from 20 countries participated in the event.

 (3)
 (2)
 (1)
 (3)
 (2)
 (3)
 (1)
 (1)
 (2)
 (2)
 (1)
 (2)
 (1)
 (3)
 (1)
 (2)
 (1)
 (1)
 (2)
 (1)

See also
 1980 Men's Olympic Marathon (Moscow)
 1982 Marathon Year Ranking
 1983 Men's World Championships Marathon (Helsinki)
 1984 Men's Olympic Marathon (Los Angeles)
 1987 Men's World Championships Marathon (Rome)
 1988 Men's Olympic Marathon (Seoul)

References

 Results
 marathonspiegel

Marathon
Marathons at the European Athletics Championships
Marathons in Greece
1982 marathons
Men's marathons